Alam el Phan is an Egyptian media group based in Cairo that supervises, manages, and produces Arabic music records and motion pictures. The company also runs the record label and TV station Mazzika.

Artists
List of notable artists who have recorded for company, including former artists and those who have died:

A
 Abdel Halim Hafez
 Amal Maher
 Amr Diab
 Amr Mostafa
 Angham
 Asalah

B
 Bia Mustafa Alloush
D
 Diana Haddad
 Diana Karazon

E
 Ehab Tawfik
 Elissa

F
 Fahd Ballan
 Farid al-Atrash
 Fayza Ahmed

H
 Haifa Wehbe
 Hani Shaker
 Hisham Abbas

I
 Issam Rajji

L
 Latifa

M
 Mai Selim
 May Hariri
 Melissa
 Mostafa Amar

N
 Nora Bo Awadh
 Nawal Al Zoghbi

R
 Ragheb Alama

S
 Shahad Alzahrani
 Sabah
 Samira Said
 Suzanne Tamim

T
 Tamer Hosny

U
 Umm Kulthum

W
 Wael Jassar
 Warda Al-Jazairia

See also
 List of record labels

References

External links
 Mazzika Group website 
 AME site: Alam el Phan page

1973 establishments in Egypt
Arab record labels
Egyptian record labels
IFPI members
EMI
Universal Music Group